The Ministry of Defence (abbreviated as MinDef) is a cabinet-level ministry in the Government of Brunei responsible for the country's national security and military forces, the Royal Brunei Armed Forces (RBAF). It is Brunei's ministry of defence. It was established immediately upon Brunei's independence on 1 January 1984. The current leadership consists of a minister, whereby the incumbent is Hassanal Bolkiah, the Sultan of Brunei and Supreme Commander of RBAF; and a deputy minister. It is headquartered in the capital Bandar Seri Begawan.

Leadership
The first Minister of Defence upon the inception of the ministry was Sultan Omar Ali Saifuddien III who was the late father of Sultan Hassanal Bolkiah and had been the preceding Sultan of Brunei until his abdication in 1967. Upon his passing in 1986, Sultan Hassanal Bolkiah took over the position and he has since become the minister up to this day.

The Second Minister of Defence portfolio appeared in the 2018 cabinet reshuffle, then was held by Halbi Mohd Yussof.

The Deputy Minister of Defence portfolio has appeared in the cabinet line-ups in 2015, and 2022. The incumbent was Abdul Razak Abdul Kadir, who took office from 7 June 2022 until his termination, alongside the abolishment of his office on 27 February 2023.

Budget
The allocated budget for the fiscal year 2022–23 is B$598 million, an increase of two percent from the previous year.

Ministers

First Minister

Second Minister

Notes

References

External links

Defence
Brunei
Brunei
1984 establishments in Brunei
 
Brunei